Mortara may refer to:

Mortara, Lombardy, a town in Italy
Mortara (surname)
 Mortara, electrocardiograph (ECG) machines manufactured by Wellch Allyn (acquired by Hillrom)